Stijn Derkx (born 3 February 1995 in Heeze) is a Dutch footballer who plays as a striker for amateur side RKSV Nuenen.

Club career
Derkx joined the Willem II youth academy aged 13 and made his professional debut for them in the Eredivisie in the final game of the 2012–13 season against AZ. He had a trial with FC Oss in summer 2015, but left the club citing personal reasons.

In April 2016 he left hometown club RKSV Heeze for Belgian outfit Esperanza Pelt, but left the club after only one season due to financial reasons. RKSV Nuenen announced the arrival of Derkx for the 2017–18 season.

International career
He played 5 matches for the Netherlands under-16 football team, making his debut in October 2010 against France U-16.

References

External links
 https://archive.today/20130629091024/http://www.regionalejeugdopleiding.nl/speler/230/stijn-derkx.html
 http://www.vi.nl/Spelers/Speler.htm?dbid=73747&typeofpage=84137

1995 births
Living people
Sportspeople from Heeze-Leende
Association football forwards
Dutch footballers
Eredivisie players
Willem II (football club) players
RKSV Nuenen players
Footballers from North Brabant